Vijayam is a 2003 Indian Telugu-language social problem film directed by Singeetam Srinivasa Rao and produced by D. Ramanaidu. The film stars Raja and Gajala. It was released on 9 May 2003.

Plot 

Raja is a tribal man who studies in Visakhapatnam and does well in school. On the other hand, Usha is the daughter of a rich businessman. Raja falls in love with Usha, but due to some miscommunication, Usha thinks that Raja is rich akin to her family. When Usha finds out that Raja is a tribal man, she becomes heartbroken. How Raja convinces Usha forms the rest of the story.

Cast 
Raja as Raja alias Raju
Gajala as Usha
Giri Babu as Usha's father
Murali Mohan as a forest officer
Sunil as Srinivas alias Siddu
Rajeev Kanakala as Usha's brother
Dharmavarapu as the hotel manager
Srinivasa Reddy as Raju's friend
Suman Setty as Raju's classmate
A. V. S. as H. Umapathi, the librarian
Brahmanandam as Vanari

Production 
Vijayam was directed by Singeetam Srinivasa Rao (who also wrote the story and screenplay, while the dialogues were written by Satyanand) and produced by D. Ramanaidu under Suresh Productions. Cinematography was handled by Hari Anumolu, and editing by the duo Krishnareddy–Madhava. Gajala was cast after Rao saw her performing in a show; she accepted the offer as Rao was the director of her favourite film Pushpaka Vimana (1987).

Soundtrack 
The soundtrack was composed by Koti.

Release and reception 
Vijayam was released on 9 May 2003. Vijayalaxmi of Rediff.com wrote, "It is embarrassing when any filmmaker picks up a bad narrative and packs his movie with lewd comedy in the name of entertainment. But when that director is a man of the stature of Singeetham Srinivasa Rao, it is even more shocking." Sify wrote, "The major drawback of Vijayam is that the basic story has not been handled well and it is better that Singeetam goes back to comedies!" Gudipoodi Srihari of The Hindu wrote, "Raja is at ease in most of the scenes. [Gajala] is quite cute. Muralimohan and Giribabu make their presence felt. The film is musically competent with well-scored numbers like Kusalama O Priya and Yenduko Premalo composed by Koti." Jeevi of Idlebrain.com rated the film 2.75 out of 5, calling it "Oldwine with youth label".

Controversy 
The film involves a scene with AVS and Brahmanandam, which Priya Richi of The News Minute condemned for passing queerness as comedy. She lamented that this was an example of poor representation of the LGBT community in Telugu cinema.

References

External links 
 

2000s Telugu-language films
Films directed by Singeetam Srinivasa Rao
Films scored by Koti
Suresh Productions films